Why So Lonely? is the fourteenth studio album by American country musician Skeeter Davis. It was released on March 25, 1968 through RCA Records.

Track listing

Personnel 
 Skeeter Davis – vocals

Production
 Felton Jarvis – producer
 Bill Walker – arranger

References 

Skeeter Davis albums
1968 albums
Nashville sound albums